Tabas (also Romanized as Ţabas; also known as Katal Ţabas) is a village in Tabas Rural District, in the Central District of Khoshab County, Razavi Khorasan Province, Iran. At the 2006 census, its population was 793, in 261 families.

References 

Populated places in Khoshab County